The Broadway Ferry station was a station on the demolished section of the BMT Jamaica Line in Brooklyn, New York City.

This station opened on July 14, 1888,  to serve the Broadway Ferry, and closed due in part to the mainline BMT Jamaica Line providing direct service to Manhattan via the Williamsburg Bridge after 1908. The station finally closed on July 3, 1916, but the segment of the line remained dormant throughout the 1920s and 1930s. 

This elevated station had two tracks and one island platform. A double crossover was located to the east of the station.

References

External links
 Station Reporter — Broadway El

Defunct BMT Jamaica Line stations
1888 establishments in New York (state)
Railway stations in the United States opened in 1888
Railway stations closed in 1916
Former elevated and subway stations in Brooklyn
1916 disestablishments in New York (state)